Undermind is the eleventh studio album by American rock band Phish, released on June 15, 2004 by Elektra Records. The album was the group's last release before they disbanded in August 2004. It is also their final studio release for Elektra Records (or a major record label for that matter); When the band reunited in 2009, their subsequent albums would be released through their own JEMP Records label which had launched in December 2005 for live releases.

Contents

The album's cover art appears to be a direct nod to Let It Be, the final studio album by The Beatles. In a review of Undermind, Glide Magazine suggests that the album's individual song contributions may also be intentionally "Beatles-esque". While the bulk of the songs are by frontman Trey Anastasio and Phish lyricist Tom Marshall, keyboard player Page McConnell, bass guitarist Mike Gordon and drummer Jon Fishman all contributed one song each. "Maggie's Revenge" is the album's only instrumental.

The introductory passage of "Scents and Subtle Sounds", which opens the album, is taken from a demo recorded by Phish frontman Trey Anastasio and the band's primary lyricist Tom Marshall. The track marks Marshall's first vocal contribution to a Phish album. In concert, this intro is regularly performed as the first verse of the main "Scents and Subtle Sounds".

Early copies of the album included a DVD with the 25 minute documentary Specimens of Beauty, a behind-the-scenes film on the making of Undermind, directed by Danny Clinch.

An extended improvisational studio jam recorded at the start of the Undermind sessions was later released as the Headphones Jam at LivePhish.com. Two excerpts from the Headphones Jam were used for the Undermind album: "Maggie's Revenge" and "Tiny" (an internet-only bonus track).

Reception and legacy

Many reviews praised "The Connection", calling it "the most commanding" and "most commercially accessible" song of Phish's recording career to date. The song never became a regular fixture in the band's live rotation, and has only been performed five times as of 2019.

One month before the album's release, Anastasio (and separately, McConnell) announced on Phish.com that the band would split following their summer tour. As such, a number of the songs were not performed live before the break up, though most have been played since the band's return in 2009, with "Scents and Subtle Sounds", the title track and "A Song I Heard the Ocean Sing" ultimately entering the band's setlist rotation. Underminds  songs remain among the least played originals in Phish's large catalog.

In February 2009, Undermind was made available as a download in FLAC and MP3 formats at LivePhish.com.

Track listing

PersonnelPhishTrey Anastasio – guitars, lead vocals, engineer
 Page McConnell – keyboards, backing vocals, lead vocals on "Army of One" and "Grind"
Mike Gordon – bass guitar, backing vocals, lead vocals on "Access Me" and "Grind"
 Jon Fishman – drums, backing vocals, lead vocals on "Grind"Other musicians: Tom Marshall – backing vocals on "Scents and Subtle Sounds (Intro)"
String section on "Secret Smile"
 Violin: Katherine Winterstein, Laura Markowitz, Signy Glendinning, Sofia Hirsch, Ann Cooper, Kathy Andrew
 Viola: Roy Feldman, Pam Reit, Hilary Hatch
 Cello: John Dunlop, Dieuwke Davydov; arrangement: Maria SchneiderProduction:'
 Tchad Blake – producer, engineer, mixing, photography
 Peter J. Carini – assistant engineer
 Danny Clinch – photography
 Bryce Goggin – engineer
 JDK – design
 Claire Lewis – mixing assistant
 Bob Ludwig – mastering
 Bill Plummer – engineer
 Maria Schneider – arranger
 Jared Slomoff – engineer
 Chris Weal – assistant engineer
 Brian Brown – production assistant, technical assistance
 Kevin Brown – production assistant, technical assistance
 Kevin Shapiro – production assistant, technical assistance
 Pam Reit – production assistant, technical assistance
 Kevin Monty – production assistant, technical assistance
 Rob O'Dea – production assistant, technical assistance
 Paul Languedoc – production assistant, technical assistance

References

External links 
 
Phish.com: Undermind
 A Fresh Start with Page McConnell interview, 2007, The Music Box

2004 albums
Phish albums
Albums produced by Tchad Blake
LivePhish.com Downloads
Elektra Records albums